The 1931 St. Louis Cardinals season was the team's 50th season in St. Louis, Missouri and the 40th season in the National League. The Cardinals went 101–53 during the season and finished first in the National League. In the World Series, they beat the Philadelphia Athletics in 7 games.

Regular season
Second baseman Frankie Frisch won the MVP Award this year, batting .311, with 4 home runs and 82 RBIs.

Season standings

Record vs. opponents

Roster

Player stats

Batting

Starters by position
Note: Pos = Position; G = Games played; AB = At bats; H = Hits; Avg. = Batting average; HR = Home runs; RBI = Runs batted in

Other batters
Note: G = Games played; AB = At bats; H = Hits; Avg. = Batting average; HR = Home runs; RBI = Runs batted in

Pitching

Starting pitchers
Note: G = Games pitched; IP = Innings pitched; W = Wins; L = Losses; ERA = Earned run average; SO = Strikeouts

Other pitchers
Note: G = Games pitched; IP = Innings pitched; W = Wins; L = Losses; ERA = Earned run average; SO = Strikeouts

Relief pitchers
Note: G = Games pitched; W = Wins; L = Losses; SV = Saves; ERA = Earned run average; SO = Strikeouts

1931 World Series 

NL St. Louis Cardinals (4) vs. AL Philadelphia Athletics (3)

Awards and honors
 Pepper Martin, Associated Press Athlete of the Year

League leaders 
 Chick Hafey, NL Batting Champion, .349
 Bill Hallahan, NL Leader (tied), 19 Wins
 Bill Hallahan NL Leader, 159 strikeouts
 Frankie Frisch, NL Leader, 28 stolen bases

Farm system

LEAGUE CHAMPIONS: Rochester, Houston, Springfield, Keokuk

References

External links
1931 St. Louis Cardinals at Baseball Reference
1931 St. Louis Cardinals  at Baseball Almanac

St. Louis Cardinals seasons
Saint Louis Cardinals season
National League champion seasons
World Series champion seasons
St Louis Cardinals